Magadansky Komsomolets was a  of the Soviet Navy.

Development and design 

The project of the submarine tenders was developed in the central design bureau "Baltsudoproekt" under the leadership of the chief designer V. I. Mogilevich. The main observer from the Navy was Captain 1st Rank G.V. Zemlyanichenko. The construction of the lead ship was completed in Nikolaev at the Black Sea shipyard in 1958. In total, seven tenders of project 310 were built for the Soviet Navy in 1958-1963.

Don-class submarine tenders had a total displacement of 7150 tons and 5030 tons while they're empty. Main dimensions: maximum length - 140 m, width - 17.67 m, draft - 5.6 m. Two-shaft diesel-electric main power plant with a capacity of 4000 hp. with. provided the ship with a full speed of 16 knots. The cruising range reached 3000 nautical miles (at a speed of 12.5 knots), autonomy - 40 days. The crew consisted of 350 people, including 28 officers.

They could serve four submarines of Project 611 or Project 613. The equipment of the floating base was capable of providing navigational and emergency repair of the hull, mechanisms and weapons and storage of 42 533-mm torpedoes in a special room. A 100-ton crane was housed at the bow of the ship.

The defensive armaments of the ships consisted of four single-barreled 100-mm artillery mounts B-34USMA and four 57-mm twin installations ZIF-31 with the Ryf control radar, the sonar station was not provided. After modernization, on two ships, instead of two aft 100-mm installations, a take-off and landing pad was equipped for basing one Ka-25 helicopter. On the last floating base of the series, the Osa-M air defense missile system was installed.

Construction and career 
The ship was built at Black Sea Shipyard in Mykolaiv and was launched on 25 June 1957 and commissioned on 1 July 1960.

It was in the summer of 1973, somewhere in the month of July. As usual in the Magadan region, especially in the Susumansky, Tenkinsky and Yagodninsky districts, there were many forest fires in the summer. Firefighters from the ship were sent to fight them, enterprises allocated their workers and equipment. In principle, nothing unusual, this happened almost every year and in our time, little has changed.

A fire was discovered on March 4, 1975 at 4 a.m. From a garbage that caught fire - no one knows, but from this garbage a cork caught fire (insulation under the inner lining). And by morning, so much smoke had accumulated in the tank corridor that nothing could be seen. The ship's duty officer sounded the alarm - everyone ran to their combat posts, and the bulkheads were torn apart. They thought that it was necessary to ventilate, but it turned out the other way around - they added air to the fire. At this time, at the main command post (GKP) of the Magadan Komsomolets, the senior political officer remained in charge, who did not have time to thoroughly study the structure of the ship. And during the extinguishing of the fire, the ship duty officer, being in a state of passion, in connection with a fire on board, seeing an off-scale alarm milliammeter over the loudspeaker, reports to the GKP about an increase in temperature in the cellar of primary detonators (in the bow of the ship, almost at the bottom). Having heard such a warning from the person on duty on the loudspeaker, the political officer makes a decision to leave the torpedo unit and flood the compartment. From the story of Georgy Lobyshev, it became clear that the signaling cable passed in the highway above the place of the fire and burned out safely with everyone else. As a result, during the cable burnout, a short circuit occurred and the current in the network increased, the arrow on the milliammeter went off scale.

In 1979, she was renamed Magadansky Komsomolets.

In 1992, she was renamed PB-27.

She was decommissioned on 24 August 1993 and later in 1994, she was moored to the pier in Sukharnaya Bay until finally towed to Dokovaya Bay for dismantling.

Pennant numbers

See also 

 Submarine tender
 Don-class submarine tender
 List of ships of the Soviet Navy
 List of ships of Russia by project number

References 

Don-class submarine tenders
Ships built at the Black Sea Shipyard
Auxiliary ships of the Soviet Navy
1961 ships
Maritime incidents in 1975